Blyttia may refer to:

[[Blyttia (journal)|Blyttia (journal)]], a Norwegian botanical journalBlyttia Arn. (1838) a legitimate genus of flowering plants in the family Apocynaceae, considered a synonym of VincetoxicumBlyttia Fr. (1839) an illegitimate genus of flowering plants in the family Poaceae, considered a synonym of CinnaBlyttia Endl. (1840) an illegitimate genus of liverworts, superseded by the genus Moerckia'' Gottsche 1860